The men's triple jump at the 1969 European Athletics Championships was held in Athens, Greece, at Georgios Karaiskakis Stadium on 16 and 17 September 1969.

Medalists

Results

Final
17 September

Qualification
16 September

Participation
According to an unofficial count, 16 athletes from 12 countries participated in the event.

 (1)
 (2)
 (2)
 (1)
 (2)
 (1)
 (1)
 (1)
 (1)
 (2)
 (1)
 (1)

References

Triple jump
Triple jump at the European Athletics Championships